{{Infobox settlement
| name                            = Mentiri National Housing Area 'A'
| official_name                   = Kampong Mentiri National Housing Scheme Area 'A'
| native_name                     = ''Perumahan Negara Mentiri Kawasan 'A| native_name_lang                = ms
| settlement_type                 = Village
| pushpin_map                     = Brunei
| pushpin_label_position          = none
| pushpin_map_caption             = Location in Brunei
| coordinates                     = 
| subdivision_type                = Country
| subdivision_name                = Brunei
| subdivision_type1               = District
| subdivision_type2               = Subdistrict
| subdivision_name1               = Brunei-Muara
| subdivision_name2               = Mentiri
| government_footnotes            = 
| leader_title                    = Village head
| leader_name                     = Pengiran Aliuddin Pengiran Damit
| postal_code_type                = Postcode
| postal_code                     = BU2129
}}Mentiri National Housing Area 'A' or Mentiri National Housing Area 1''' is a village administrative division in Brunei-Muara District of Brunei. It is a village subdivision of the mukim or subdistrict of Mentiri. It is also a designated postcode area with the postcode BU2129.

Geography 
Mentiri National Housing Area 'A' is located in the eastern part of Brunei-Muara District. It borders the village subdivisions of Batu Marang to the north, Mentiri National Housing Area 'B' to the west, Mentiri to the southwest and Pangkalan Sibabau to the south. It also borders the Brunei Bay along its eastern border.

See also 
 Mentiri National Housing Area 'B'
 National Housing Scheme

References 

Villages of Brunei